Suddenly at His Residence is a 1946 crime novel by the British writer Christianna Brand. It is the third in a series featuring her detective Inspector Cockrill. In the United States it was published using the alternative title The Crooked Wreath.

Synopsis
During the final months of the Second World War, a man is murdered on the very evening he intends to disinherit his various family members.

References

Bibliography
 Bargainnier, Earl F. & Dove George N. Cops and Constables: American and British Fictional Policemen. Popular Press, 1986.
 Reilly, John M. Twentieth Century Crime & Mystery Writers. Springer, 2015.

1946 British novels
Novels by Christianna Brand
British crime novels
Novels set in England
British detective novels
The Bodley Head books